Joey Stanley McCoy (born January 18, 1962 in Cincinnati, Ohio, USA) is an American singer known for being a backing vocalist for Carlos Toshiki & Omega Tribe.

Biography 
McCoy started his career as a backing vocalist and arranger for Anri's 1987 albums, Sumertime Farewells and Meditation, before being brought to serve as a backing vocalist for Carlos Toshiki & Omega Tribe's first album, Down Town Mystery. The band was composed of vocalist Carlos Toshiki, guitarist Shinji Takashima, and keyboardist Toshitsugu Nishihara, as their second guitarist and bandmaster, Mitsuya Kurokawa, left the band due to health issues.  After "Aquamarine no Mama de Ite," Joey joined in the band officially with the release of the single "Reiko," where he was the lead vocalist.

After the break up of the group, he was featured on the 1991 album Perfect Selection Dracula by Konami Kukeiha Club, where he rapped on three of the songs. The year after, in 1992, he released his only album, Summer Time Memories, before disappearing from the scene altogether. He later moved to Hawaii.

In the 2017 science fiction novel Honor's Reserve by Michael La Ronn, the character Grayson McCoy is named after Joey McCoy after finding out about the band from his uncle, who was a band manager. He stated that "he brought up a crate from the basement, and on the very top I saw this CD–it was a Japanese band... and in the middle of four Japanese guys was a black guy. I was intrigued."

Summer Time Memories

Summer Time Memories is the only album by Joey McCoy, released on April 22, 1992 by Continental. The album includes covers from Kiyotaka Sugiyama & Omega Tribe and Kiyotaka Sugiyama's solo career. Sugiyama himself wrote a message for the album, which was included in the insert booklet, praising the album and McCoy's vocals. The album also included keyboardist Hidetoshi Yamada and guitarist Makoto Matsushita of the AB'S, saxophonist Shigeo Fuchino, and guitarist  Shinji Takashima of Omega Tribe. The album was rare as only a limited number of CD were made.

On November 21, 2009, the first track, "Futari no Natsu Monogatari," was uploaded to YouTube, triggering a rise in interest in the album and boosting the price. On September 9, 2020, the full album was ripped and uploaded to YouTube. In March 2021, Tower Records announced that the album would be re-released on April 21, 2021.

Track listing

Credits
Backing Vocals – Joey McCoy, Wornell M. Johns, Joey Johnson
Co-producer – Fumio Miyata
Directed By – Kenichi Sakagami
Guitar – Makoto Matsushita, Shinji Takashima
Keyboards –  Hidetoshi Yamada
Lyrics – Brian Peck, Douglas Pashley, Joey McCoy
Mixing – Shigeo Miyamoto
Synth programming – Atsushi Umehara, Hajime Hasebe, Toru Shimotakahara
Saxophone – Shigeo Fuchino

Discography

Albums

Singles

References

Living people
American male singers
Omega Tribe (Japanese band) members
1962 births